Pieces of Me is the second album by singer-songwriter Lori McKenna.  The album received favorable reviews.

She is supported on the album by a number of Boston area musicians.  The bass playing of Mike Rivard and drumming of Billy Beard are particularly noteworthy. Ellis Paul, Richard Shindell and Kris Delmhorst all make appearances as vocalists.

Track listing
All songs by Lori McKenna
 "Mars" – 4:50 
 "Never Die Young" – 4:42 
 "God Will Thank You" – 3:32 
 "This Fire" – 4:30 
 "Fireflies" – 4:17 
 "Girl Like Me" – 3:33 
 "Instead" – 4:42 
 "Pink Sweater" – 4:17 
 "Deserving Song" – 4:15 
 "Pieces of Me" – 4:31 
 "You Are Loved" – 4:25

References 

2001 albums
Lori McKenna albums